Street rod may refer to:

Street rod (car), a type of custom car
Street Rod (video game), a 1990 video game